Live at Secret Garden is a live album by Joachim Witt, recorded at a performance in 2005.

Track listing

Liebe Und Zorn (5:37)
Krieger Des Lichts (4:17)
Das Geht Tief (6:07)
Bataillon D'Amour (4:38)
Treibjagd (4:52)
Fluch Der Liebe (5:12)
...Und Ich Lauf (5:16)
Jetzt Und Ehedem (5:10)
Supergestört Und Superversaut (4:35)
Die Flut (6:23)
Eisenherz (5:48)
Goldener Reiter (7:07)
Herbergsvater (9:01)

References

Joachim Witt albums
2005 live albums